Mora County is a county in the U.S. state of New Mexico. As of the 2010 census, the population was 4,881. Its county seat is the census-designated place (CDP) Mora. The county has another CDP, Watrous, a village, Wagon Mound, and 12 smaller unincorporated settlements. Mora became a formal county in the US, in what was then the New Mexico Territory, on February 1, 1860. Ecclesiastically, the county is within the Roman Catholic Archdiocese of Santa Fe. County population peaked at approximately 14,000 circa 1920, declining to about 4,000 to 5,000 since the 1970s; the 2018 estimate was 4,506.

History

Prior to Spanish conquest, the Mora area was Native American country. Although not an area of heavy settlement by stationary tribes such as the Puebloans, the Mora Valley was often used by nomadic nations, including the Ute, Navajo, and Apache.

Spanish period
Hispano settlers had occupied lands within the Mora Valley without legal title ever since Governor Juan Bautista de Anza of Nuevo México (then under the authority of the Spanish Empire) made peace with the Comanches in the late 18th century, opening up the east side of the Sangre de Cristo Mountains for settlement. The Mora Valley then became a travel-way for various Spanish explorers and others. It was not permanently inhabited by colonists until the early 19th century. The written history of the settlement of Mora dates to Christian missionary church-building in 1818, three years before Mexican independence from Spain.

Mexican period, and permanent settlement
Mora valley was more formally and broadly settled in 1835. The settlers came primarily from Las Trampas, but also from Picuris and Embudo, then from Santa Cruz de La Cañada, Taos, and the Ojo Caliente area, and later still from the southern part of New Mexico, moving on from the San Miguel del Vado Land Grant, and also coming in via Las Vegas, New Mexico. The families each received a strip of property by a September 28, 1835, land grant of Centralist Republic of Mexico Governor of New Mexico Albino Pérez. The grant gave land title for over 800,000 acres (1,250 square miles; approx. 323,800 hectares, or 3,200 km2) in Mora Valley to various families willing to relocate; estimates vary from 25 to 76 families.

Texan and Mexican–American War periods
When the Republic of Texas seceded from Mexico on March 2, 1836, it claimed but did not actually control eastern New Mexico, including what is now Mora County. The town of Mora was raided unsuccessfully in 1843 by a group of freebooters from the more narrowly defined Republic of Texas, on the pretext of stopping cattle rustling but with a clear intent of horse theft and taking the local women and children as slaves). The annexation of Texas by the United States on February 19, 1846, and US General Stephen W. Kearny's taking of Santa Fe, New Mexico in August of that year, made these lands subject to American control under the Kearny Code and the US provisional government of New Mexico, but the area remained in the minds of many long-term residents part of the Republic of Mexico under President Santa Ana.

During the Mexican–American War, beginning on April 25, 1846, much of New Mexico including Mora County was subject to the military occupation of United States under martial law. During the Taos Revolt of the war, Mexican-nationalist Hispano and Puebloan militia fought the United States Army, repelling a small force in the First Battle of Mora on January 24, 1847, only to endure the village and surrounding ranches, farms, and crops being burned to the ground in the Second Battle of Mora on February 1, effectively ending active rebellion in the area. The provisional government's first legislature met on December 6, 1847, beginning American civil government in the region.

In the United States 
The Mexican–American War ended February 3, 1848, with Mora Valley and rest of the region then under formal US control, as the Mexican Cession of the Treaty of Guadalupe Hidalgo relinquished all claims by Mexico to lands north of the Rio Grande. Still claimed by state of Texas until the Compromise of 1850, the New Mexico Territory, with smaller boundaries, was formalized on September 9 of that year.

A US Army installation, Fort Union, was built in 1851 in Mora Valley. It encroached on 8 square miles of private lands of the Mora Grant for its entire span of operation, without permission of or compensation to the local land owners. This led to a protracted legal controversy, reaching all the way to the General Land Office, the Secretary of War, and the US Congress; Nevertheless, the nearby fort and its garrison provided a stable source of income to local farmers, and several grist mills were founded in Mora, including a successful one opened in 1855 by regional trader and Taos Revolt US volunteer cavalry veteran Ceran St. Vrain. The US county of Mora was established in the territory on February 1, 1860. A church was built in the Mora Valley village of Chacon in 1864, reflecting additional settlement into the area. The Mora Grant / Fort Union land dispute was exacerbated in 1868 by an order of President Andrew Johnson that established a government timber reservation that encompassed 53 more square miles the private grant land (the entire Turkey Mountains sub-range of the Sangre de Cristos). After being rebuilt twice, the fort eventually closed in 1891, still without restitution to land-owners, despite the Kearny Code, Hidalgo Treaty, and other agreements supposedly guaranteeing continuity of Spanish and Mexican land-grant rights.

New Mexico (with reduced land area) became the 47th US state on January 6, 1912, despite concerns in Congress that the population was insufficiently assimilated into American culture, especially after an influx of Mexican refugees from 1910 onward, fleeing the Mexican Revolution. These newcomers mostly settled far south of Mora County, though it remained primarily Spanish-speaking, as it was still largely populated by the same, now-expanded, families who had settled the area three-quarters of a century earlier). On February 21, 1916, Special Master William E. Gortner sold off unallotted common lands of the Mora Grant to the State Investment Company and Edward B. Wheeler in an auction at the door of the San Miguel County Courthouse. Without access to the grazing and timbering lands, many residents sought work outside Mora.

In April 2013, Mora County became the first county in the United States to ban oil and gas drilling on public and private lands.

The modern county seat, Mora, is a census-designated place, and consists of four neighboring settlements and three plazas.

Geography

Adjacent counties
 Colfax County – north
 Harding County – east
 San Miguel County – south
 Santa Fe County – west
 Rio Arriba County – west
 Taos County – northwest

National protected areas
 Carson National Forest (part)
 Fort Union National Monument
 Kiowa National Grassland (part)
 Santa Fe National Forest (part)
 Rio Mora National Wildlife Refuge

Demographics

2000 census
As of the 2000 census, there were 5,180 people, 2,017 households, and 1,397 families living in the county. The population density was 3 people per square mile (1/km2). There were 2,973 housing units at an average density of 2 per square mile (1/km2). The racial makeup of the county was 58.88% White, 0.10% Black or African American, 1.14% Native American, 0.12% Asian, 36.97% from other races, and 2.80% from two or more races; 81.64% of the population were Hispanic or Latino of any race.

There were 2,017 households, out of which 31.20% had children under the age of 18 living with them, 50.5% were married couples living together, 11.9% had a female householder with no husband present, and 30.7% were non-families. Of all households, 26.90% were made up of individuals, and 10.6% had someone living alone who was 65 years of age or older. The average household size was 2.54 and the average family size was 3.08.

In the county, the population was spread out, with 26.70% under the age of 18, 7.5% from 18 to 24, 24.3% from 25 to 44, 26.1% from 45 to 64, and 15.4% who were 65 years of age or older. The median age was 40 years. For every 100 females there were 102 males. For every 100 females age 18 and over, there were 100.2 males.

The median income for a household in the county was US$24,518, and the median income for a family was $27,648. Males had a median income of $24,483 versus $18,000 for females. The per capita income for the county was $12,340. About 20.90% of families and 25.40% of the population were below the poverty line, including 25.90% of those under age 18 and 18.40% of those age 65 or over.

2010 census
As of the 2010 census, there were 4,881 people, 2,114 households, and 1,295 families living in the county. The racial makeup of the county was 70.9% white, 1.3% American Indian, 0.7% black or African American, 0.3% Asian, 23.5% from other races, and 3.3% from two or more races. Those of Hispanic or Latino origin made up 81.0% of the population. In terms of ancestry, and 0.8% were American.

Of the 2,114 households, 26.4% had children under the age of 18 living with them, 43.5% were married couples living together, 10.9% had a female householder with no husband present, 38.7% were non-families, and 33.2% of all households were made up of individuals. The average household size was 2.31 and the average family size was 2.92. The median age was 46.0 years.

The median income for a household in the county was $37,784 and the median income for a family was $42,122. Males had a median income of $42,992 versus $42,630 for females. The per capita income for the county was $22,035. About 10.5% of families and 11.9% of the population were below the poverty line, including 10.8% of those under age 18 and 20.6% of those age 65 or over.

Places of interest
 Fort Union National Monument

Communities

Village
 Wagon Mound

Census-designated places
 Mora (county seat)
 Watrous

Unincorporated communities

 Buena Vista
 Canoncito
 Chacon
 Cleveland
 Golondrinas
 Guadalupita
 Holman
 La Cueva
 Ledoux, Mora County, New Mexico
 Ocate
 Ojo Feliz
 Rainsville

Former communities
 Valmora (now a private retreat center)

Politics

Mora County has voted for the presidential nominee of the Democratic Party in every election since 1976; prior to that, it leaned Republican.

Education
School districts:
 Las Vegas City Public Schools
 Mora Independent Schools
 Wagon Mound Public Schools

See also
 National Register of Historic Places listings in Mora County, New Mexico

References

External links
 Official county website
 Mora County website

 
1860 establishments in New Mexico Territory
Populated places established in 1860
Taos Revolt
Hispanic and Latino American culture in New Mexico